The Rumyantsev Case is a 1955 Soviet crime film directed by Iosif Kheyfits.

Plot
Young truck-driver Sasha Rumyantsev, trying to avoid running over a child, has an accident, his car crashes into a brick wall. Rumyantsev receives minor injuries, but his occasional passenger, a girl named Klavdya, is injured more seriously. Rumyantsev faces prosecution, but the investigator finds out the real reason of the accident and finds Rumyatsev innocent.

Sasha and Klavdya fall in love with each other, they are ready for living together and plan a wedding, but Rumyantsev falls into trouble again ... Rumyantsev's chief Korol'kov, scoundrel and drunkard, draws Sasha into his illegal enterprise. Because of Korol'kov, Rumyantsev becomes an accomplice in theft: he carries stolen goods in his truck. Rumyantsev is arrested, the police captain who investigates the case is unconditionally sure that the driver is guilty. However, the experienced сolonel Afanasyev believes Rumyantsev and exposes the real criminals.

Production
 Production design by Isaak Kaplan, Berta Manevich
 Set decoration by Yu. Freydlin
 Makeup department by V. Sokolov

Cast
 Aleksey Batalov as Sasha Rumyantsev, truck-driver
 Ninel Podgornaya as Klavdya Naumenko, the student, Rumyantsev's bride
 Sergey Lukyanov as Sergey I. Afanasyev, police colonel
 Pyotr Lobanov as Samokhin, a police captain, inspector of  OBKhSS
 Gennadi Yukhtin as Paul Evdokimov, truck-driver, Rumyantsev's friend
 Vladimir Lepko as Vasily Lemekhov, truck-driver
 Yevgeny Leonov as Mikhail Snegirev, truck-driver
 Inna Makarova as Nonna Snegireva, Mikhail Snegirev's wife
 Nikolay Kryuchkov as Korol'kov, chief of operations department
 Viktor Chekmaryov as Shmyglo, a repeat offender, the ringleader of a gang of plunderers
 Ants Eskola as Prus, director of the shop, plunderer
 Arkady Trusov as Yakov Egorovich, truck-driver, Rumyantsev's eldest friend
 Ivan Selyanin as Vassily Stepanovich, truck-driver, Rumyantsev's eldest friend
 Lyudmila Golubeva as Lyuba, the student, Claudia's friend
 Yevgeny Losakevich as Zoya Pavlovna, Claudia's aunt
 Viktor Koval as Sasha, orphan, an adopted Paul Evdokimov

References

 
 
 «Дело Румянцева» Аннотированный каталог фильмов киностудии «Ленфильм» 1918—2003
 
 
 

1956 films
1950s crime drama films
Soviet crime drama films
Russian crime drama films
1955 drama films
1955 films
1956 drama films
1950s Russian-language films